Bainbridge is a village in Ross County, Ohio, United States, along Paint Creek. The population was 860 at the 2010 census.

Bainbridge is the location of Pike Lake State Park.

Geography

Bainbridge is located at  (39.227074, -83.269564).

Demographics

2010 census
As of the census of 2010, there were 860 people, 357 households, and 228 families living in the village. The racial makeup of the village was 96.4% White, 0.8% African American, 0.2% Native American, and 2.6% from two or more races. Hispanic or Latino of any race were 0.6% of the population.

There were 357 households, of which 31.1% had children under the age of 18 living with them, 43.7% were married couples living together, 15.7% had a female householder with no husband present, 4.5% had a male householder with no wife present, and 36.1% were non-families. 30.5% of all households were made up of individuals, and 16.3% had someone living alone who was 65 years of age or older. The average household size was 2.36 and the average family size was 2.91.

The median age in the village was 43.2 years. 22.6% of residents were under the age of 18; 6.5% were between the ages of 18 and 24; 23.5% were from 25 to 44; 26.5% were from 45 to 64; and 20.9% were 65 years of age or older. The gender makeup of the village was 45.9% male and 54.1% female.

2000 census
As of the census of 2000, there were 1,012 people, 397 households, and 277 families living in the village. The population density was 1,975.9 people per square mile (766.1/km2). There were 451 housing units at an average density of 880.5 per square mile (341.4/km2). The racial makeup of the village was 99.41% White, 0.20% African American, 0.10% Native American, 0.10% Asian, and 0.20% from two or more races. Hispanic or Latino of any race were 0.20% of the population. It is the hometown of medal of honor recipient Forrest E. Everhart

There were 397 households, out of which 35.0% had children under the age of 18 living with them, 48.6% were married couples living together, 17.4% had a female householder with no husband present, and 30.0% were non-families. 25.7% of all households were made up of individuals, and 13.6% had someone living alone who was 65 years of age or older. The average household size was 2.49 and the average family size was 2.95.

In the village, the population was spread out, with 26.8% under the age of 18, 8.6% from 18 to 24, 28.7% from 25 to 44, 19.2% from 45 to 64, and 16.8% who were 65 years of age or older. The median age was 36 years. For every 100 females there were 85.0 males. For every 100 females age 18 and over, there were 77.7 males.

The median income for a household in the village was $26,417, and the median income for a family was $31,645. Males had a median income of $32,000 versus $20,625 for females. The per capita income for the village was $14,905. About 17.0% of families and 19.9% of the population were below the poverty line, including 30.4% of those under age 18 and 16.0% of those age 65 or over.

Education
Bainbridge students attend high school at Paint Valley High School, which contains students from Bainbridge and Bourneville. The school mascot is the bearcat, and the teams play in the Scioto Valley Conference.

Bainbridge is also home of the first dental school in the United States.  Opened by Dr. John M. Harris in 1825, the school is now a museum.

Bainbridge has a public library, a branch of the Chillicothe & Ross County Public Library.

References
 book by Nancy Baum written in collaboration with the Bainbridge Historical Society

External links
 Fall Festival of Leaves
 First Dental School
 Photographs of Bainbridge

Villages in Ross County, Ohio
Villages in Ohio